The Platinum Collection Volume 3: Shout to the Lord 3 is a compilation praise and worship album of Christian Contemporary music by the Hillsong Church.

Track listing

 "Better Than Life" (Marty Sampson; from Hope)
 "Need You Here" (Reuben Morgan; from Hope)
 "Everyday" (Joel Houston; from Everyday)
 "Praise In The Highest" (Darlene Zschech; from God He Reigns)
 "Your Love Is Beautiful" (Morgan; from You Are My World)
 "Your Name High" (Houston; from This Is Our God)
 "Song Of Freedom" (Sampson; from Hope)
 "Exceeding Joy" (Miriam Webster; from Hope)
 "Break Free" (Joel Houston; from Saviour King)
 "Run" (Houston; from This Is Our God)
 "Church On Fire" (Russell Fragar; from Touching Heaven Changing Earth)
 "Jesus, What A Beautiful Name" (Tanya Riches; from God Is in the House)
 "Before The Throne" (Fragar; from All Things Are Possible)
 "I Give You My Heart" (Morgan; from God Is in the House)

2009 compilation albums
Hillsong Music compilation albums